The 2014 Recopa Sudamericana (officially the 2014 Recopa Santander Sudamericana for sponsorship reasons) was the 22nd edition of the Recopa Sudamericana, the football competition organized by CONMEBOL between the winners of the previous season's two major South American club tournaments, the Copa Libertadores and the Copa Sudamericana.

The competition was contested in two-legged home-and-away format between Brazilian team Atlético Mineiro, the 2013 Copa Libertadores champion, and Argentine team Lanús, the 2013 Copa Sudamericana champion. The first leg was hosted by Lanús at Estadio Ciudad de Lanús in Lanús on July 16, 2014, while the second leg was hosted by Atlético Mineiro at Estádio Mineirão in Belo Horizonte on July 23, 2014.

In the first leg, the visitors Atlético Mineiro won by a score of 1–0. In the second leg, the score was 3–2 in favour of Lanús after 90 minutes, meaning the title would be decided by extra time. Atlético Mineiro were crowned Recopa Sudamericana champion for the first time after two own goals in extra time gave them a 4–3 win (5–3 on aggregate).

Qualified teams

Format 
The Recopa Sudamericana was played on a home-and-away two-legged basis, with the Copa Libertadores champion hosting the second leg. If tied on aggregate, the away goals rule was not used, and 30 minutes of extra time was played. If still tied after extra time, the penalty shoot-out was used to determine the winner.

Match details

First leg

Second leg

References

2014
2014 in South American football
Club Atlético Lanús matches
Clube Atlético Mineiro matches
2014 in Brazilian football